The Battle of Dandanaqan was fought in 1040 between the Seljuq Turkmens and the Ghaznavid Empire near the city of Merv (now in Turkmenistan). The battle ended with a decisive Seljuq victory, which subsequently brought down the Ghaznavid domination in Greater Khorasan.

Background
Forced out of Transoxiana in 1034 by the Karakhanids, the Seljuks settled in Khwarazm under the advocacy of the Ghaznavid governor Harun. His murder in 1035, forced them to flee through the Kara Kum desert towards Merv, but they switched instead to Nasa on the edges of Khurasan. Hearing of this threat, Ghaznavid Sultan Ma'sud sent Iltughdi with a large army to Nasa. Initially successful having driven off the Seljuk forces, the Ghaznavid army began squabbling over the spoils. The Seljuk, led by Chaghri, returned and fell upon the disorganized Ghaznavids and defeated them. As a result, Ma'sud entitled the Seljuk to three cities in Khurasan, Dihistan, Nasa, and Farawa. After conducting raids as far as Balkh, all of Khurasan fell to the Seljuk Turks.

Battle
During the march of Mas'ud's army to Sarakhs, the Seljuq raiders harassed the Ghaznavid army with hit-and-run tactics. Swift and mobile Turkmens were better fit to fight battles in the steppes and deserts than was the conservative heavily-laden army of Ghaznavid Turks. Seljuq Turkmens also destroyed the Ghaznavids' supply lines and so cut them off the nearby water wells. This seriously reduced the discipline and the morale of the Ghaznavid army.

On May 23, 1040, around 16,000 Seljuk soldiers engaged in battle against a starving and demoralised Ghaznavid army in Dandanaqan and defeated them near the city of Merv destroying a large part of the Ghazanavid forces.

Aftermath
The Seljuks occupied Nishapur, Herat, and besieged Balkh. By 1047, Tughril had coins minted in Nishapur calling him, al-sultan al-mu'azzam and Shahanshah.

Mas'ud fled to India, was overthrown, and was finally murdered in prison.

Notes

References

Sources

Battles involving the Ghaznavid Empire
Battles involving the Seljuk Empire
1040 in Asia
Conflicts in 1040
History of Turkmenistan
11th century in the Seljuk Empire